One House Street was a freeform rap/dance party television program highlighting videos, artist performances, street dance and a high-tech DJ booth for “scratching” and live DJing.

The one-hour weekly program premiered in 1991 and was broadcast in Philadelphia (WGBS), Chicago (WGBO), and Miami (WBFS).

The show was created and produced by Michael Nise, executive producer of DANCIN’ ON AIR and DANCE PARTY USA, in conjunction with Combined Broadcasting.

One House Street quickly became the number one show in its time period in Miami  within the first three weeks, and number two in Philadelphia within the first two months. The show only aired for 50 weeks.

External links
 OMNI 2000, Inc - Copyright and trademark holder of Dance Party USA, Dancin' On Air, One House Street, and Under 18 Not Admitted.

1991 American television series debuts
1990s American television series
Dance_television_shows
Year of television series ending missing